The  is a Japanese festival celebrated from 24–26 August in Shinjō, Yamagata Prefecture. Mikoshi and approximately twenty floats are drawn through the streets, accompanied by odori, drums, and other performers. It has a two hundred and fifty-year history and was designated as an Important Intangible Folk Cultural Property in 2009.

History
The festival in Shinjō, and in particular their use of floats called , is thought to have been initiated in 1756 in the midst of a famine during the Hōreki era. The event was planned by Tozawa Masanobu (1720–1756) who was the head of the Shinjō domain.  The festival served not only to serve as a time of prayer for the upcoming harvest, but also to improve morale among the populace.  The floats appearing in the festival are thought to have been initially influenced by the Gion Matsuri, but have since focused on themes related to kabuki, legendary animals, and elaborate scenes in nature.

In 2009, the festival was granted the Important Intangible Folk Cultural Property designation by the Japanese government's Agency for Cultural Affairs.

Event structure

Floats will parade through the city while being accompanied by performers who play flutes, cymbals, taiko, and shamisen on a set repertoire of four pieces. The floats themselves are constructed by various municipalities within the city, and each municipality has its own associated performance group. Approximately 20 groups are represented in total. Generally, floats include life-size versions of famous kabuki performers, animals, and historical figures that are depicted in nature such as on mountains or rivers.

In 2015, event coordinators began using GPS systems to position floats for the parade, help event attendants locate floats, and to ease concerns over traffic congestion.

See also
Matsuri
List of Important Intangible Folk Cultural Properties
Important Intangible Cultural Properties of Japan

References

External links
 Shinjō Matsuri homepage

Festivals in Japan
Tourist attractions in Yamagata Prefecture
Important Intangible Folk Cultural Properties
Culture in Yamagata Prefecture